Trigonopterus kalimantanensis is a species of flightless weevil in the subfamily Cryptorhynchinae from Kalimantan (Borneo, Indonesia).

Etymology
The specific name is derived from the Indonesian word for Borneo, Kalimantan.

Description
Individuals measure 2.35–2.65 mm in length.  General coloration is a dark rust-color, with a black pronotum and light rust-colored antennae.

Range

Phylogeny
T. kalimantanensis is part of the T. bornensis species group.

References

kalimantanensis
Beetles of Indonesia
Endemic fauna of Indonesia
Endemic fauna of Borneo
Beetles described in 2014